North Pointe Elementary School may refer to:
 North Pointe Elementary School - Clear Creek Independent School District - Houston
 North Pointe Elementary School - Boone County Schools - Hebron, Kentucky
 North Pointe Elementary School - Anderson School District Five - Anderson, South Carolina